Kelly Chambers is an English football manager and former player who currently manages Reading of the FA Women's Super League (FA WSL). She is also Reading's director of football.

As a player, Chambers captained Reading while they were playing in the lower leagues.

Playing career 
As a player, Chambers captained Reading; however, her playing career ended after an anterior cruciate ligament injury in 2012.

Managerial career 
After her retirement, Chambers was appointed Director of Women's and Girls football, and has remained in this role ever since.

Originally, Chambers became manager of Reading whilst in the third tier of English football. After gaining promotion to the WSL 2, now known as the FA Women's Championship, Jayne Ludlow was appointed manager.

Ludlow guided Reading to a third-place finish in the 2014 WSL 2 season, however stepped down at the end of the season to manage the Wales National Women's Team. Chambers has been manager ever since.

Chambers won the 2015 WSL 2 division, earning Reading a promotion to the top flight. Chambers' Reading finished the season, level on points with Doncaster Rovers Belles who also got promoted, but with a goal difference of +46 - four higher than Doncaster who had +42. What made the title victory so impressive, was that it was with a group of players who also had part-time jobs.

Her first season in the WSL, Chambers managed to avoid relegation. Despite only winning one game all season, Reading managed to finish above Doncaster who were relegated.

The 2017/18 WSL season was Reading's highest finish in club history. Chambers secured a fourth-place finish, with a total of 32 points in 18 games.

Since then, Chambers has failed to recreate the success of that season. Her following two seasons (2018/19, 2019/20) both resulted in a fifth-place finish.

In December 2018, Chambers won the November 2018 LMA (League Managers Association) Manager of the Month Award. Victories against Bristol City, Brighton and Hove Albion and Everton, saw Chambers' side take maximum points in November, and jump two places in the table.

Personal life 
Chambers has a daughter. She also attended Whiteknights primary school in Shinfield.

Managerial Statistics

References 

1986 births
Living people
English women's footballers
Reading F.C. Women players
English women's football managers
Reading F.C. Women managers
Women's Super League managers
Place of birth missing (living people)
Women's association footballers not categorized by position